"Better the Devil You Know" is a song written by Brian Teasdale and Dean Collinson for English singer Sonia. The single was released in April 1993 as the second and final single from Sonia's third album, Better the Devil You Know. The song was the 's entry at the Eurovision Song Contest 1993, finishing in second place.

Song information
For A Song for Europe 1993, the BBC asked the heads of each of the Eurovision Network member broadcasters for their opinion regarding who should represent the United Kingdom from a shortlist the BBC had prepared. A plurality chose 22-year-old recording artist Sonia, who already had a number-one hit to her credit. She then sang eight different songs at the national final. For the second year running, a nationwide telephone vote was held to pick one song to send to the Eurovision finals, held this year in Millstreet, County Cork, Ireland. "Better the Devil You Know", the fifth song performed, won with over 156,000 supporters, twice as many as the second-place entry.

In Millstreet, the song was performed nineteenth on the night, after 's Fazla with "Sva bol svijeta", and before the ' Ruth Jacott with "Vrede". At the end of judging that evening, "Better the Devil You Know" took the second-place slot with 164 points. This was the fourth time the UK had ranked second in the voting since  and the fourteenth time overall.

The song was a retro rock 'n' roll offering with a 1950s flair. Sonia tells the story about how in love she is with her boyfriend, wishing he won't hurt her, for her love is true. She lets it known that she would "sell her heart and soul" to get his unconditional love in return, rationalising that it's better that one deal with "the devil you know" (him with his faults) instead of "the devil you don't" (another potential boyfriend).

Commenting on the song, Collinson stated that he'd written the song years before in an attempt to recreate "Wake Me Up Before You Go-Go" by Wham!. The song was played as part of a "Eurovision special" on Top of the Pops 2. As the show's narrator, DJ Steve Wright commented during the song's introduction, "This is a good song, but Sonia is a bit too eager to please, so therefore didn't give it the required 'I don't care too much about Eurovision' attitude", implying that was her downfall. For her part, immediately after the winner was known, Sonia accepted defeat in a humble manner, smiled, and shook winner Niamh Kavanagh's hand.

After Eurovision, the song peaked at number 15 on the UK Singles Chart and stayed in the chart for seven weeks. The B-side was a song called "Not What I Call Love", co-written by Sonia and also on her third album.

Critical reception
Pan-European magazine Music & Media commented, "One for the Guinness Book Of Records. With this cheerful song on a Motown beat the UK scored its 14th second place at the Eurovision Songcontest, this time behind Ireland's Niamh Kavanagh."

Formats and track listings
 7-inch and cassette single
 "Better the Devil You Know" – 2:36
 "Not What I Call Love" – 4:08

 12-inch single
 "Better the Devil You Know" (extended mix) – 4:20
 "Not What I Call Love" – 4:08

 CD single
 "Better the Devil You Know" – 2:36
 "Better the Devil You Know" (extended mix) – 4:20
 "Not What I Call Love" – 4:08

Charts

References

1993 singles
1993 songs
Arista Records singles
Eurovision songs of 1993
Eurovision songs of the United Kingdom
Sonia (singer) songs